Scribneria is a monotypic genus of grass in the family Poaceae. It contains the single species Scribneria bolanderi, which is known by the common name Scribner's grass. It is native to the west coast of North America from Washington to Baja California. This petite annual grass grows in many types of habitat.

References

External links 
 Grassbase - The World Online Grass Flora
 Jepson Manual Treatment
 USDA Plants Profile
 Grass Manual Treatment
 Photo gallery

Monotypic Poaceae genera
Pooideae
Flora of the United States
Taxa named by Eduard Hackel